Trinity Bridge may refer to:

Trinity Bridge, Greater Manchester
Trinity Bridge, Crowland
Trinity Bridge, Saint Petersburg
Trinity College Bridge, Cambridge